Rother is a local government district in East Sussex, England. Its council is based in Bexhill-on-Sea. The district is named after the River Rother which flows within its boundaries.

History
The District of Rother was formed on 1 April 1974, under the Local Government Act 1972, by the merger of the Municipal Borough of Bexhill, the Municipal Borough of Rye and Battle Rural District.  It is one of three districts within the county without borough status and is the easternmost one: the other two being Lewes to the west, and Wealden in the centre. The borough of Hastings lies surrounded by Rother.

Governance

Rother District Council is elected every four years, with currently 38 councillors being elected at each election. From 1983 until 2019, the Conservatives have had a majority on the council, apart from between 1991 and the 1999 election when no party had a majority.

Since 2019, the 'Rother Alliance' has controlled the council, formed of a mixture of Independent, Liberal Democrat, Labour and Green Party councillors.

The council is often criticised by its residents.

Premises
The council is based at Bexhill Town Hall on London Road in Bexhill, which was built in 1895 for the Bexhill Urban District Council, which became Bexhill Borough Council in 1902. The building continued to serve as the seat of local government following the reorganisation in 1974 which created Rother District.

Wards 
Bexhill has nine wards: the remaining councillors represent the other 11 wards.

Parishes 
The lowest level of local government is the civil parish: there are 29 within the Rother District which are:

Playden and East Guldeford are merged in the statistical analysis although they are both civil parishes in their own right. Playden has a Parish Council whilst East Guldeford holds a Parish Meeting. Ashburnham and Penhurst are also separate parishes.

Geography
Rother District covers two areas of relief: to the south, a section of the High Weald; and to the north the lower land, named the Rother Levels, across which flow the River Rother, which rises on the Weald and flows easterly towards Rye Bay, and its tributaries. For much of the course of the main river it constitutes the boundary between East Sussex and Kent, and is given the alternative title of the ’’Kent Ditch’’. Tributaries of the river include the Rivers Dudwell, Tillingham and Brede.

The district reaches the coast in the vicinity of Bexhill, and on the shores of Rye Bay.

Climate
Climate in this area has mild differences between highs and lows, and there is adequate rainfall year round.  The Köppen Climate Classification subtype for this climate is "Cfb" (Marine West Coast Climate/Oceanic climate).

Demographics
Rother has one of the oldest populations (with a median age of 52 years) and the lowest per capita income in the UK.

Transport
There are several main roads crossing the district. The major trunk road is the A21, London to Hastings road; it is joined by the A28 road from Ashford road near Hastings; which in turn is crossed by the A268 Hawkhurst to Rye road. There is also the A259 coastal route

The Hastings Line, East Coastway Line and the Marshlink Line are the three railway lines in the District; The Kent and East Sussex Railway tourist line terminates at Bodiam.

Long-distance footpaths include the Sussex Border Path; and the Saxon Shore Way, which links with the 1066 Country Walk.

Landmarks
Major landmarks include Bodiam and Camber Castles; and Battle Abbey.

References

 
Non-metropolitan districts of East Sussex